Danuta Jazłowiecka (born 19 May 1957 in Opole) is a Polish politician. She was elected to the Sejm on 25 September 2005, getting 14,248 votes in 21 Opole district as a candidate from the Civic Platform list. In June 2009 she was elected as a Member of the European Parliament (MEP) from the Civic Platform list. She joined Group of the European People's Party (Christian Democrats) in European Parliament. She was re-elected in 2014.

See also
Members of Polish Sejm 2005-2007
Members of the European Parliament for Poland 2009–14
Members of the European Parliament for Poland 2014–19

References

External links
Danuta Jazłowiecka - official page
Danuta Jazłowiecka - parliamentary page - includes declarations of interest, voting record, and transcripts of speeches.

1957 births
Living people
People from Opole
Members of the Polish Sejm 2005–2007
Civic Platform politicians
Civic Platform MEPs
Women MEPs for Poland
MEPs for Poland 2009–2014
MEPs for Poland 2014–2019
Women members of the Sejm of the Republic of Poland
Women members of the Senate of Poland
Members of the Polish Sejm 2007–2011
Members of the Senate of Poland 2019–2023